Route 61 may refer to:

Route 61 (MTA Maryland), a bus route in Baltimore, Maryland
London Buses route 61, contracted bus route in England
U.S. Route 61

See also
 List of highways numbered 61
 Highway 61 (disambiguation)

61